"The Revenge" is the seventh episode of the second season of the NBC sitcom Seinfeld, and the show's 12th episode overall. The story revolves around George Costanza's (Jason Alexander) plot to exact revenge on his boss, with his friend Elaine Benes' (Julia Louis-Dreyfus) help, after he quits his job at Rick Barr Properties and is refused re-employment. Meanwhile, Jerry (Jerry Seinfeld) and his neighbor Kramer (Michael Richards) get even with a laundromat owner—who they believe has stolen money from Jerry—by pouring cement into one of his washing machines.

Written by series co-creator Larry David and directed by Tom Cherones, the episode premiered in the United States on NBC on April 18, 1991. Largely based on David's own experiences, "The Revenge" was the first episode he wrote without Seinfeld's collaboration. The episode also contains the first mention of Newman, a suicidal man who lives in Jerry and Kramer's apartment building, who would later become a popular recurring character. As the episode is the first in which Kramer does physical comedy which the character would become well-known for, some cast and crew members consider it a turning point for the show. When first broadcast in the United States, the episode gained a Nielsen rating of 14.4/24 and was met with positive response from critics.

Plot
George furiously quits his job after being disallowed use of the executive toilet but regrets the decision when he realizes he has no good job prospects. Jerry suggests that George go back to work and pretend he never quit. George takes this advice, but his former boss, Rick Levitan (Fred Applegate), refuses to let him stay and insults him. As revenge, George decides to slip a Mickey into Levitan's drink during an office party and enlists Elaine to help him by flirting with him as a distraction. Levitan is enthralled by Elaine, and his good mood prompts him to let George have his job back. George attempts to intercept the drink, but after Levitan welcomes him back with a toast sprinkled with insults at George's expense, he changes his mind and lets him down the spiked drink. After being re-fired, George again regrets losing his temper with Levitan and brainstorms job opportunity ideas.

When Jerry goes to the laundromat, Kramer persuades him to take his laundry with him. After retrieving the laundry the following day and returning Kramer's portion, Jerry remembers he had hidden a large sum of money in his laundry bag, but is unable to find it. Vic, the owner of the laundromat, says he is not responsible for valuables; Kramer and Jerry both assume Vic stole the money. While Jerry distracts Vic with laundering questions, Kramer puts cement mix in one of the washing machines as revenge. Once they have acted out the plan, Kramer discovers that he had the money all along. It turns out to be just enough to cover the damage to the washing machine.

Kramer tells Jerry about his friend Newman, who repeatedly threatens to kill himself by jumping off the apartment building. When he does jump, he jumps from the second floor and survives, much to Kramer's amusement. When Newman threatens to jump again, Kramer asks Newman if he wants to go shoot some pool with him. Newman declines, stating that he has plans to go to the movies.

Production

"The Revenge" was written by series co-creator Larry David and directed by Tom Cherones. All prior Seinfeld episodes were co-written by Seinfeld and David. The Revenge is the first episode written by David alone, though Seinfeld did proofread the script and would continue to do so for all scripts up to the eighth season. George's storyline in the episode is based on David's own experiences while a writer at Saturday Night Live. David had quit SNL halfway through the 1984-1985 television season, but felt he had made a mistake once he reached his home. His neighbor Kenny Kramer, who later served as the main inspiration for Kramer, suggested David return to work the following Monday and act as if nothing had happened. Unlike George, the ploy succeeded for David, who remained with SNLs writing staff until the end of that season. George's reason for quitting was inspired by Seinfeld writer Larry Charles' use of the private restroom in Seinfeld and David's office instead of the public one. The Newman subplot was inspired by one of David's neighbors, who once jumped from the second floor of the apartment building in which they both lived. The unseen character Mr. Papanickolas, who is mentioned by Kramer, was named after production crew member Pete Papanickolas.

"The Revenge" was first read by the cast of the show on February 13, 1991 and was filmed in front of a live audience on February 20, 1991. Filming of the episode had been delayed two days due to President's Day. Both Alexander and Louis-Dreyfus praised the scene in which Jerry and George discuss the types of employment George could apply for after he quit his job. Louis-Dreyfus stated she was jealous that she was not in the scene. A number of scenes in the episode were removed prior to broadcast, such as one in which George and Kramer meet in the hallway and Kramer informs George that Jerry has gone to the laundromat. The writers decided that George could just say Kramer told him Jerry was at the laundromat and, upon that addition, the scene was cut. Initially, during Jerry and George's conversation about jobs, George mentions Regis Philbin, when they discuss George being a talk show host. Additional dialogue between George and Jerry at the laundromat was also removed. Because the episode "The Stranded" did not air until mid season three, the few references "The Revenge" contained to the episode were cut. The Newman subplot was significantly reduced; the character initially appeared in one scene, but it was never filmed. In that scene, he would have explained to Jerry and Kramer that he jumped from the roof, but an awning broke his fall, though Jerry and Kramer would remain skeptical. The episode also involved the second appearance of Harold the building superintendent, who had previously appeared in "The Apartment." Harold would inform the main characters that Newman made up the story about the awning breaking his fall, though, with the reduction of the Newman subplot, the scene was removed.

The cast considered the episode a turning point for the show. As a method actor, Richards insisted on dumping a real bag of cement into the washing machine used on set, so that the proper physical reactions to such a heavy object would be present. Richards stated that at that point, "rather than talking funny, I wanted to do funny." During the first take of the scene, Richards fell through a door and it had to be filmed again. "The Revenge" is also the first episode in which the George and Elaine characters collaborate. Louis-Dreyfus later stated that she and Alexander immediately had "some sort of shorthand with one another comedically, and [she] really relished that."

Although Newman's appearance was ultimately cut from the episode, auditions were held for the role; Tim Russ, who would go on to star in Star Trek: Voyager, auditioned, as did William Thomas, Jr., known for his appearance on The Cosby Show, who was cast in the part. Newman does share a brief dialogue with Kramer at the end of the episode, David recorded the lines, though he was not credited; this would be the first of David's 38 uncredited appearances on the show. The show's writing staff did not intend to have the character return in any later seasons, but because the idea of having actor Wayne Knight as a neighbor appealed to them, they re-cast Knight in the role of Newman in the character's first on-camera appearance in the season 3 episode "The Suicide." Afterwards, Knight re-recorded Newman's lines for the syndicated version of this episode to establish better continuity. Both Knight's and David's dialogue were included on the Seinfeld: Volume 1 DVD boxset. Additionally, Fred Applegate guest-starred as George's boss and John Capodice portrayed Vic, the laundromat owner. Deck McKenzie, who worked as Seinfeld's stand-in, portrayed George's colleague Bill. Teri Austin portrayed Ava, a co-worker of George's; she would appear again later in "The Stranded," which was filmed as part of season two, but aired as part of season three. Patrika Darbo, who played George's co-worker Glenda, would reappear later in the season five episode "The Sniffing Accountant" as a woman Newman flirts with.

Reception
First broadcast in the United States on NBC on April 18, 1991, Nielsen Media Research estimated that the episode gained a Nielsen rating of 14.4 and an audience share of 24. This means that 14.4% of American households watched the episode, and that 24% of all televisions in use at the time were tuned into it. Seinfeld was the 15th most-watched program of the week it was broadcast in, and the sixth most-watched program broadcast on NBC.
Entertainment Weekly reviewers Mike Flaherty and Mary Kaye Schilling gave the episode a mixed review and graded it with a C, stating "Although neat for its parallel plotting and George's hilariously clueless career chats with Jerry, 'The Revenge' is not so sweet." IGN critic Andy Patrizio considered "The Revenge" one of his personal favorites of season two. The scene in which Kramer struggles to put cement in one of the washing machines has gained positive responses from critics. Margery Eagan of The Boston Globe cited the scene as a perfect example of Kramer's personality. Neal Justin of the Minneapolis Star-Tribune also considers the scene to be one of the show's "classic moments." Daily News of Los Angeles critic Jody Leader also praised Seinfeld for how he distracted Vic in the scene.

References

External links

"The Revenge" at Allmovie
"The Revenge" at Sony Pictures

Seinfeld (season 2) episodes
1991 American television episodes
Television episodes written by Larry David
Suicide in television